Ronggui railway station is an elevated station on the Guangzhou-Zhuhai Intercity Railway.

The station is located on Ronggui Subdistrict in the Shunde District of Foshan City, Guangdong Province, China. It is the last station in Shunde for trains travelling in the direction of Zhongshan. To the station's east is the Shunde High-tech Zone Zone B, to the south Guizhou Avenue, to the north Xinyou Road and to the west Baogong Logistics Park. Ronggui Station started operations on 7January 2011.

References

Shunde District
Railway stations in China opened in 2011